Ellia Kofi Junior (born 7 March 2004) is a Ghanaian footballer who currently plays as a midfielder for Ghana Premier League side Cape Coast Ebusua Dwarfs.

Career 
Kofi started his senior career with Ebusua Dwarfs in October 2020 ahead of the 2020–21 season. On 12 December 2020, he made his Ebusua Dwarfs debut as 76th-minute substitute, replacing Obed Bentum during a 1–0 Ghana Premier League loss to Medeama at Cape Coast Sports Stadium. His first start came on 31 January 2021 in a 2–2 draw against Aduana Stars. On 3 March 2021, after putting up an impressive performance to guarantee a 2–1 home victory for Dwarfs, he was adjudged the man of the match.

On 24 April 2021, Kofi scored his first senior goal in a league match against Great Olympics by scoring the second goal in the first half as Ebusua Dwarfs won 4–1. He was substituted in the 90th minute to make way for Jindo Morishita. After breaking through the squad in the first round of the season, he went on to start in the 10 of the final 17 matches and ended the season with 22 league appearances and one goal and three assists. At the end of the season, he was reportedly set to go for trials at Belgian Jupiler Pro League side KAA Gent from 1 September 2021 to 31 October 2021.

References

External links 
 

Living people
2004 births
Association football midfielders
Ghanaian footballers
Ebusua Dwarfs players
Ghana Premier League players